Trichodrymonia is a genus of flowering plants belonging to the family Gesneriaceae.

Its native range is Mexico to Venezuela and Peru.

Species:
 Trichodrymonia alata (Kriebel) M.M.Mora & J.L.Clark 
 Trichodrymonia alba (Wiehler) M.M.Mora & J.L.Clark

References

Gesnerioideae
Gesneriaceae genera